Wanfu Temple is a Buddhist temple on Mount Huangbo in Fuqing, Fujian, China. It is famous as the original temple of Yinyuan Longqi, the temple's 33rd abbot and a Chan master.  He later travelled to Japan with his disciple Muyan to found the Japanese Ōbaku school of Zen.

Found in 789 by Chan master Zhenggan in the Tang dynasty (618–907), it was destroyed and rebuilt several times. A modern restoration of the entire temple complex was carried out in 1989 and again in 2016.

Mampuku-ji, head temple of the Ōbaku school, is named after this temple.

History

Tang dynasty
The temple was first built by Chan master Zhenggan in 789 in the Tang dynasty (618–907) with the name of Boruo Hall or Bore Hall. It was enlarged as a temple eight years later. Zhenggan was a disciple of the Six Patriarch of Chan Buddhism Huineng.

In 848, Huangbo Xiyun received ordination as a monk in the temple. After gaining skills and qualifications under Baizhang Huaihai, he returned to Wanfu Temple to taught Chan Buddhism.

Song dynasty
During the Shaoxing period (1131–1162) in the Song dynasty (960–1279), Chan master Shanguo moved to Wanfu Temple from Miyin Temple, Hunan, where he promulgated Buddhist doctrines and delivered Buddhist precepts for over ten years.

Ming dynasty
In the 23rd year of Hongwu period in the Ming dynasty (1368–1644), namely 1390, under the support of Zhou Xinjian, monk Daxiu restored the temple on the original site.

Wanfu Temple was completely destroyed in the battles between Japanese pirates and Ming army. It was subsequently rebuilt by Sun Jianyuan and Sun Jingyuan in the late 17th century. The emperor inscribed and honored the name "Wanfu Chan Temple", which is still in use now.

In 1637, Yinyuan Longqi was unanimously chosen as the new abbot. He raised funds to establish more than 30 halls and rooms, including the Shanmen, Mahavira Hall, Dharma Hall, Bell tower, Drum tower, etc.

Qing dynasty
In 1654, in the 11th year of Shunzhi period of the Qing dynasty (1644–1911), under the invitation of Japanese monks, Yinyuan Longqi led monks to go to the east Japan to preach Buddhism. His disciple Xingpei replaced him as the new abbot.

During the reign of Qianlong Emperor, monk Qingfu renovated and refurbished the temple.

Republic of China
In 1928, a disastrous flood struck the temple and destroyed most of the temple buildings.

People's Republic of China
In 1949, the year of the defeat of the Communists over the Nationalists in the Chinese Civil War, the whole Wanfu Temple went up into flames in a catastrophic fire. All of the cultural relics, scriptures, historical documents, and other works of art were damaged or destroyed in the disaster. Dharma Hall and Abbot's Room were rebuilt in 1957.

In 1979, a Japanese visiting mission led by Yoshii Shimamine came to the site to worship the cradle of Japanese Ōbaku school of Zen.

Wanfu Temple was designated as a National Key Buddhist Temple in Han Chinese Area by the State Council of China in 1983.

In April 1989, the reconstruction project of the temple was launched. The reconstruction took 8 years, and lasted from 1989 to 1997. On December 8, 1997, the newly established temple was consecrated by eminent monks.

In 2016, Cao Dewang, a well-known entrepreneur in China, donated 250 million yuan (38.4 million U.S. dollar) to redecorate Wanfu Temple.

Architecture
The extant buildings were built between 1989 and 1997, which were modeled the traditional architectural style of the Ming and Qing dynasties. The complex include the following halls: Shanmen, Mahavira Hall, Hall of Four Heavenly Kings, Bell tower, Drum tower, Hall of Guru, Dharma Hall, Memorial Hall of Yinyuan Longqi, etc.

References

Bibliography
 
 

Buddhist temples in Fuzhou
Tourist attractions in Fuzhou
1997 establishments in China
20th-century Buddhist temples
Religious buildings and structures completed in 1997
Chan temples
Fuqing